William Henry Adams (8 January 1919 – 1 March 1989) was an English professional footballer who played for Hartlepools United, Tottenham Hotspur, Carlisle United, Chelmsford City and Workington.

Playing career
Adams began his career as an amateur with Harlepools United. In January 1937 the full back signed for Tottenham Hotspur. Adams featured in one FA Cup match  for the Lilywhites and played a further 10 matches during the World War II    war time years. In June, 1946 he signed for his local club Carlisle United where he went on to make 33 appearances and netting a solitary goal. After a spell with Chelmsford City he ended his career at Workington.

References

1919 births
1989 deaths
People from Arlecdon and Frizington
Footballers from Cumbria
English footballers
English Football League players
Hartlepool United F.C. players
Tottenham Hotspur F.C. players
Carlisle United F.C. players
Workington A.F.C. players
Chelmsford City F.C. players
Cheltenham Town F.C. players
Hereford United F.C. players
Association football fullbacks